Richard Berkley may refer to:

 Sir Richard Berkley (died 1604), MP for Gloucestershire

 Richard L. Berkley (born 1931), mayor of Kansas City, Missouri, 1979–1991
 Richard J. Berkley (1928–1987), physicist

See also
 Richard Berkeley (disambiguation)